The 1983–84 USAC Championship Car season consisted of two races, beginning in Du Quoin, Illinois, on September 5, 1983, and concluding in Speedway, Indiana, on May 27, 1984.  The USAC National Champion and Indianapolis 500 winner was Rick Mears.  This was the last year that the Championship comprised more than one race.

By this  time, the preeminent national championship season was instead sanctioned by CART.

Schedule and results

All races were run on Oval/Speedway courses.

Final points standings

Note: Drivers not entered for the Indianapolis 500 were not eligible for points.

References
 
 
 http://media.indycar.com/pdf/2011/IICS_2011_Historical_Record_Book_INT6.pdf  (p. 191-192)

See also
 1983 Indianapolis 500
 1983 CART PPG Indy Car World Series
 1984 CART PPG Indy Car World Series

USAC Championship Car season
USAC Championship Car season
USAC Championship Car